State Route 166 (SR 166) is a state highway in the U.S. state of California. It connects the Central Coast to the southern San Joaquin Valley, running from State Route 1 in Guadalupe and through Santa Maria in Santa Barbara County to State Route 99 in Mettler in Kern County.

Route description

Route 166 starts off in Guadalupe in northwestern Santa Barbara County and heads east towards Santa Maria, the largest city on its eastern journey. It then joins with U.S. Route 101 for the last few miles in Santa Barbara County before crossing the Santa Maria River and splitting off in San Luis Obispo County. For the next , SR 166 crosses the Santa Barbara/San Luis Obispo county line a total of five times. This stretch follows the Cuyama River through a canyon separating the Sierra Madre Mountains from mountains in San Luis Obispo County, and then opens out into the Cuyama Valley, passing cattle ranches, going through the Russell Ranch Oil Field, and passing Aliso Canyon Road, the turnoff to the South Cuyama Oil Field. On the north during this stretch is the mile-high Caliente Range, which contains Caliente Mountain, the highest peak in San Luis Obispo County.

After going through the towns of New Cuyama and Cuyama, the highway meets SR 33 north of Ventucopa. SR 166 ends at SR 99 in Mettler, and it is the last exit for both I-5 and SR 99 southbound before they merge near Wheeler Ridge.

In Kern County, Highway 166 is known as the Maricopa Highway. West of Maricopa, where it skirts Santa Barbara and San Luis Obispo counties, it is called the Cuyama Highway. In the cities of Santa Maria and Guadalupe, it is known as Main Street.

SR 166 is part of the California Freeway and Expressway System, but is not part of the National Highway System, a network of highways that are considered essential to the country's economy, defense, and mobility by the Federal Highway Administration. The route is eligible for the State Scenic Highway System, but it is not officially designated as a scenic highway by the California Department of Transportation. From US 101 to SR 33, SR 166 is known as the "CHP Officers Irvine and Stovall Memorial Highway". In February 1998, a large storm swelled the Cuyama River and caused it to wash out a section of the highway. Officers Britt Irvine and Rick Stovall were responding to an early morning call about a truck accident when their CHP cruiser drove off the washed out section.

History

Before 1964, the portion of SR 166 merged with SR 33 was part of US 399.

Major intersections

See also

References

External links

California @ AARoads.com - State Route 166
Caltrans: Route 166 highway conditions
California Highways: SR 166

166
State Route 166
State Route 166
State Route 166
Cuyama Valley